KSAH-FM (104.1 MHz) is a commercial radio station, licensed to Pearsall, Texas, and serving the San Antonio metropolitan area.  KSAH-FM and sister station KSAH 720 AM simulcast a Classic Regional Mexican radio format, specializing in Norteño music.  The station is owned by Alpha Media with the license held by Alpha Media Licensee, LLC Debtor in Possession.  The studios and offices are located on Eisenhauer Road in Northeast San Antonio.  

KSAH-FM has an effective radiated power (ERP) of 100,000 watts, the current maximum for FM stations.  The transmitter is off Texas State Highway 97 in Hindes, Texas, about 40 miles south of San Antonio.  Programming is also heard on 20,000 watt booster station KSAH-1-FM in Charlotte, Texas.  Like KSAH-FM, it broadcasts on 104.1 MHz.

History
The station signed on the air in 1991 as 94.1 KRIO.  In 1998, it changed its call sign to KKMG and moved to its current dial position at 104.1 MHz.  Then on September 11, 2002, the call letters switched to KMFR and on April 12, 2004, back to KRIO. 

Beginning in 2010, KRIO began simulcasting with KSAH 740. On February 10, 2011, the station changed its call sign to the current KSAH-FM.  Beginning in 2012 and continuing for six years, the simulcast was discontinued when KSAH 740 switched to a Spanish-language sports radio format, using ESPN Deportes Radio.  When that network was discontinued in 2018, the two stations resumed their simulcast.

References

External links

Mexican-American culture in San Antonio
SAH-FM
SAH-FM
Radio stations established in 2002
2002 establishments in Texas
Alpha Media radio stations